Barbettes are several types of gun emplacement. Barbette may also refer to:

 , a patrol boat of the Royal Australian Navy
 Barbette (performer) (1899–1973), American female impersonator, high-wire performer and trapeze artist
 Paul Barbette (1620–1666?), Dutch physician
 Barbette (headdress) a type of medieval headdress worn in the 13th century
 Barbette Mountain, a summit in the Canadian Rockies

See also
Barbet (disambiguation)

Barbetta, Italian restaurant in New York City